Vivian Hoyles Tozer (1870–1954) was a solicitor and politician in Queensland, Australia. He was a Member of the Queensland Legislative Assembly.

Early life 
Vivian Hoyles Tozer was born on 27 May 1870 in Gympie, the son of Horace Tozer (a Member of the Queensland Legislative Assembly for Wide Bay) and his wife Mary Hoyles (née Wilson). He was involved in the Wide Bay Light Horse Regiment and was a keen rifleman.

Politics 
A member of the Country and Progressive National Party, Tozer represented Gympie in the Queensland Legislative Assembly from 11 May 1929 to 11 May 1935.

Later life 
Tozer donated the land on which Gympie State High School stands.

Tozer died on 5 September 1954 in Gympie, survived by his wife and son. His funeral was held at St Peter's Church of England in Gympie on 6 September, after which he was buried in the Gympie Cemetery.

References

Members of the Queensland Legislative Assembly
People from Gympie
1870 births
1954 deaths